John Vulich (1961 – October 12, 2016) was an American make-up effects artist and co-founder of Optic Nerve Studios.

Early life
Vulich was born in Fresno, California. During high school he experimented with special effects and began corresponding with Tom Savini. Savini brought Vulich in as a personal assistant for the Friday the 13th series.

Special effects career
Vulich continued working on 80's monster movies, including Ghoulies, Day of the Dead, and The Lost Boys. In 1989 Vulich decided to open his own company, Optic Nerve Studios, with Everett Burrell.

From there Vulich and the rest of Optic Nerve Studio would go on to work on well known science fiction and horror shows including Buffy the Vampire Slayer, Angel, The X-Files, and Babylon 5.

Vulich sold Optic Nerve Studio to Glenn Hetrick and went on to work in production at Disney Studios before dying of a heart attack on October 12, 2016.

Awards

References 

1961 births
2016 deaths
American make-up artists
Date of birth missing
Special effects people
Primetime Emmy Award winners